Kamegawa Dam  is a gravity dam located in Kumamoto Prefecture in Japan. The dam is used for flood control and water supply. The catchment area of the dam is 10.2 km2. The dam impounds about 24  ha of land when full and can store 2650 thousand cubic meters of water. The construction of the dam was started on 1968 and completed in 1982.

See also
List of dams in Japan

References

Dams in Kumamoto Prefecture